Habeit Ya Leil is the fourth album of Nawal Al Zoghbi. It included three hit singles. It was a follow up to the duo she performed live and recorded in 1996 with Lebanese Artist Wael Kfouri, Meen Habibi Ana.

Surprisingly, after  releasing two albums with Music Box International, Nawal chose Relax-In, the production label which produced her debut album Wehyati Andak, for this album. Afterwards, Nawal terminated the contract within the release of her next album.

Track listing
 "Habeit Ya Leil"
 "Ana Hlaweit"
 "Beini W Beinak"
 "Sodfah"
 "Noss El Alb"
 "Tamini Habibi"
 "La Tfaker"
 "Ghareeb Al Raai"

Music videos
 Habeit Ya Leil
Habeit Ya Leil had almost 5 Nawal duplicates, each singing several bits of the song. In some scenes they appear together, but in others they're by themselves.

References

1997 albums
Arabic-language albums
Nawal Al Zoghbi albums